Oscar Cargill (19 March 1898, Livermore Falls, Maine – 18 April 1972, Montclair, New Jersey) was a writer, editor, and professor of English.

He graduated in 1922 from Wesleyan University and became an English instructor at Marietta College and then Michigan State University. He enrolled as a graduate student at Columbia University, studied in 1927–1928 at Stanford University on a Cutting fellowship from Columbia, and received his doctorate from Columbia in 1930. Cargill became a professor at New York University, served for some years as the chair of the English department, and from 1948 to 1966 was the director of N.Y.U.'s American civilization program.

Most of Cargill's publications dealt with the works of nineteenth- and twentieth-century American authors. Upon his death he was survived by his widow, two daughters, and six grandchildren.

Selected publications

as editor: 

as editor: 
with Thomas Clark Pollock: 
as editor with Thomas Clark Pollock: 

as editor with N. Bryllion Fagin and William J. Fisher:

References

American literary critics
Wesleyan University alumni
Columbia University alumni
New York University faculty
People from Livermore Falls, Maine
1898 births
1972 deaths